Maksim Manukyan (born 10 December 1987) is an Armenian Greco-Roman wrestler. He competed in the men's Greco-Roman 85 kg event at the 2016 Summer Olympics. 

Maksim Manukyan became world Greco-Roman wrestling champion (80 kg) after beating Belarusian Radik Koulin 5-0 at the World Wrestling Championship in Paris on 22 August 2017.

Manukyan European champion 2018 Russia, Kaspisk

Mixed martial arts record

|-
| Win
| align=center| 2–0
| Jeremy Fattorusso
| Submission (guillotine choke)
| Gladiator Challenge: Underground 2
| 
| align=center| 2
| align=center| 0:34
| Valley Center, California, United States
|
|-
| Win
| align=center| 1–0
| Joseph Keith
| TKO (punches)
| LXF 5
| 
| align=center| 1
| align=center| 1:46
| Commerce, California, United States
|

References

1987 births
Living people
Armenian male sport wrestlers
Olympic wrestlers of Armenia
Wrestlers at the 2016 Summer Olympics
Universiade medalists in wrestling
Universiade silver medalists for Armenia
Wrestlers at the 2015 European Games
Wrestlers at the 2019 European Games
European Games competitors for Armenia
World Wrestling Championships medalists
European Wrestling Championships medalists
Medalists at the 2013 Summer Universiade
Armenian male mixed martial artists
Mixed martial artists utilizing Greco-Roman wrestling
21st-century Armenian people